Moderat is the self-titled first studio album by electronic music project Moderat, consisting of Modeselektor and Apparat. It was released on 11 May 2009 on BPitch Control.

Track listing
 "A New Error" - 6:07
 "Rusty Nails" - 4:32
 "Seamonkey" - 6:15
 "Slow Match" (feat. Paul St. Hilaire) - 5:08
 "3 Minutes of" - 3:18
 "Nasty Silence" - 3:13
 "Sick with It" (feat. Dellé a.k.A Eased from Seeed) - 3:46
 "Porc #1" - 2:40
 "Porc #2" - 3:03
 "Les Grandes Marches" - 4:28
 "Berlin" - 1:23
 "No. 22" - 5:41
 "Out of Sight" - 5:42

Bonus tracks
  "BeatsWaySick" (feat. Busdriver) - 4:23
 "Rusty Nails" (Shackleton Remix) - 9:38

Bonus DVD
 "Les Grandes Marches"
 "Rusty Nails"
 "Woltersdorf" (Interlude)
 "BeatsWaySick" (feat. Busdriver)
 "Rüdersdorf" (Interlude)
 "Out of Sight"
 "Berlin" (Interlude)
 "A New Error"
 "Quedlinburg" (Interlude)
 "No. 22"
 "Seamonkey" (Easter Egg)

References

Moderat albums
2009 albums
BPitch Control albums